Grand Avenue is a major north–south thoroughfare in Los Angeles, California. Lined with museums, concert venues, and theaters, this urban center on Bunker Hill attracts millions of people a year. Grand Park stretches between the Los Angeles City Hall and the Los Angeles Music Center on Grand Avenue. In 2007, a $3 billion Grand Avenue Project was proposed to revive Downtown Los Angeles.

History
Originally called Charity Street (or Calle de la Caridad in Spanish), it is located just east of Hope Street, but contrary to myth, there was never a corresponding Faith Street, representing the trinity of virtue, "Faith, Hope and Charity." Olive Street (or Calle de Aceituna in Spanish) is situated to the east of Grand Street instead. Charity Street was renamed Grand by the Los Angeles City Council on February 15, 1887.

Throughout the 18th and 19th centuries, Grand Avenue was not a popular area. The addition of Bunker Hill began the attraction of investors to develop it into the prominent block it is today.

In the 1870s, Prudent Beaudry, a French Canadian, used his savings to buy 20 acres which is now what makes downtown Los Angeles. Beaudry hoped that the area he purchased would become a wealthy and iconic residential hotspot.

During the late 19th century, Grand Avenue became the home to many mansions and hotels, like the Melrose, which was first a private residence and then modified into a hotel. In the earlier part of the 20th century, many private mansions were converted into rooming houses or hotels.

As stated in the New York Times, while discussing Grand Avenue, “First conceived in the 1950s by downtown power brokers like Buffy Chandler, the wife of Norman Chandler, who was then the publisher of The Los Angeles Times, the avenue was intended as a citadel of office towers and cultural monuments at the top of Bunker Hill.” In order to create this, neighborhoods of Victorian houses were bulldozed down in the 1950s. What took over those neighborhoods are freeway ramps, tunnels, underground roadways, and streets. When building first started in the 1950s the planners made a decision to take the new cultural and business district and put a wall around it, so it was separated from the rest of downtown.

In 1966, the Los Angeles Civic Center Mall was built between Grand Avenue and Hill Street. There is a memorial fountain dedicated to Arthur J. Will, that will later be moved to Grand Park.

In 2001 a committee was created called the private Grand Avenue Committee. According to Larchmont Chronicles, “Some observers say the idea of vitalizing the vacant parking lots of Grand Avenue goes back to the walkabout taken up and down the street by Mayor Richard Riordan, Cardinal Roger Mahony and others in 1996.” It wasn't until 2003 when the Grand Avenue Committee expressed its desired outcome, “which consisted of uniting the separate government entities that often were at odds — the City and the County of Los Angeles — by bringing their representatives together in a joint powers authority focused on just one issue – reimagining Grand Avenue.” Martha L. Welborne, the wife of the writer that quote was taking from, was hired to create and help manage the Grand Avenue Committee in 2001. Welborne managed the committee for more than a decade, bringing new ideas to light.

Mr. Gehry was hired in 2005 to design an entertainment area along with a shopping complex. This along with the construction of Disney Hall were critical to the Avenue's success. Due to the positioning of being on the east side of Bunker Hill and along the Museum of Contemporary Art and the Colburn School of Music and Dance, it is seen as a link between the old city and the new cultural district, according to New York Times. Mr. Gehry had a vision that while walking down Grand Avenue one would pass under an elevated walkway that leads to a view of downtown where the skyline can be seen, he intended to do this by adding a large terrace above Olive Street. However, developers had other ideas and forced Mr. Gehry to remove this unique idea. According to New York Times, “Mr. Gehry has tried to compensate for this by anchoring the corner with restaurants and packing more stores into Olive Street.” The decorations one may see on the buildings are swirling canopies, Mr. Gehry did this in hopes to “pump life back into the restaurants and shops above.” 

The Grand Avenue Project was a project to develop the avenue, the Music Center plaza and City Hall's Grand Park, completed in 2022. Also, two towers designed by Frank Gehry. In addition, The Broad museum and an apartment tower were linked to Grand Avenue by a public outdoor plaza.

Education
A number of schools are located on Grand Avenue, including the Colburn School and the High School for the Visual and Performing Arts. Los Angeles Trade–Technical College and FIDM's Los Angeles campus are also located on this street.
 Metropolitan Junior College
 Orthopaedic Hospital Medical Magnet High School

Transportation
Transportation is provided by the county's Metropolitan Transportation Authority (Metro) lines, which include Lines 37, 38, 55, 70, 76, 78, 79 as well as an A Line station at its intersection with Washington Boulevard.

Art Museums & Performance Venues 
In 1981, Arata Isozaki, a Japanese architect, designed the Museum of Contemporary Art, also now more commonly known as the MOCA. Among the many art museums on Grand Avenue, the MOCA is the only museum fully founded by fellow artists. They specialize in contemporary and some historical art exhibitions.

The Broad museum, funded by American entrepreneur Eli Broad, and began construction in 2011. It is part of the Grand Avenue Development, along with the creation of the Civic Park.

The Los Angeles Music Center is a performance arts center that houses Ahmanson Theatre, Dorothy Chandler Pavilion, Mark Taper Forum, Roy and Edna Disney / Cal Arts Theatre, and Walt Disney Concert Hall. It was first funded by Mrs. Dorothy Chandler in the middle of the 20th century because she thought that Los Angeles lacked a cultural facility. She raised $400,000 to build an official building for the Los Angeles Philharmonic Orchestra. Mrs. Chandler's efforts continued with gathering the funding to build the Dorothy Chandler Pavilion in 1964.

In 1967, both the Ahmanson Theatre and the Mark Taper Forum opened their doors to house various kinds of concert performances from musical artists to plays and operas. The Ahmanson Theatre was named after Howard Ahmanson, the chairman of the Home Savings and Loan Association board. The Ahmanson Theatre is able to convert into many modes that can accommodate different types of performances. The Mark Taper Forum is named after banker, philanthropist, and real estate developer S. Mark Taper. Out of the performance venues, the Forum is the smallest, catering towards live and experimental theater.

In 1988, Disney chose Frank Gehry to build Walt Disney Concert Hall and it opened in 2003. The Walt Disney Concert Hall is famous for its steel focused architecture. It is a landmark for the Los Angeles locals and musicians. The creation of Walt Disney Concert Hall helped pave the way for further developments in downtown Los Angeles.

The Staples Center is a sports and entertainment venue located in downtown Los Angeles in the area of Grand Avenue. The arena opened on October 17, 1999, with a concert by Bruce Springsteen & The E Street Band. Many sporting events have taken place such as basketball and hockey games played by the LA Lakers, LA Clippers, LA Sparks or LA Kings. There have also been many musical artists of different genres playing at this venue such as U2, Garth Brooks, Prince or Beyonce. Besides concerts and sport events, there have also been events such as the Grammys or FIDM's graduation.

In 1985 the Japanese American National Museum was a Smithsonian Affiliate Establishment that promotes an ethnic and cultural diversity by sharing the Japanese American experience. It is located on Grand Avenue in the historic Little Tokyo district of downtown Los Angeles. JANM has traveled all over the world doing nearly a 100 exhibits onsite and 20 exhibits around the world. Some of the locations include the following: the Smithsonian Institution and the Ellis Island Museum in the United States, and several leading cultural museums in Japan and South America. This museum is a way for people to learn and discover the heritage and culture that it offers.

It is an educational and fun place to go with families or friends. Prices range from $7-$16 and open Monday through Friday from 9 a.m to 5p.m. Due to COVID, it is temporarily closed and they are hosting virtual tours for students in schools and adult groups. The museum hopes to reopen in January 2021.

Churches 
Cathedral of Our Lady of the Angels was built in 1999, after being relocated due to damage from the 1994 Northridge earthquake. Professor José Rafael Moneo designed the cathedral.

Grand Avenue is a pivotal part of Downtown Los Angeles. The Cathedral of Our Lady of the Angels is a beautiful church and landmark that resides on Grand Avenue. Although the current Cathedral was built in 2002, this church has been a place of worship since ideas for it began in 1859.

Dating back to the earliest time of 1859, Los Angeles began to build St. Vibiana's Cathedral. St. Vibiana's lasted until 1996 when it was condemned, and Los Angeles was left with no Cathedral. Due to the massive Northridge earthquake and other demolition, there was no longer a Cathedral Church in Los Angeles. Los Angeles has about 4 million Catholics. With such a large religious population, it was important to the citizens of Los Angeles to provide a place of worship. The Cathedral of Our Lady of the Angels has become home for a many of Los Angeles residents.

Glory Church LA is the American English ministry of the Korean Glory Church, a Christian gospel-focused ministry.

Hospitals 
Dignity Health's California Hospital Medical Center, formerly known as “Catholic Healthcare West” was originally founded by an Irish Sister group called "The Sisters of Mercy" in 1887.

Throughout the years, Dignity Health has built 39 hospitals across the country with one of them being built on Grand Avenue in 1887. California Hospital Medical Center has over 300 beds and their services include general health care, trauma, and emergency care.

Public art 
Along Grand Hope Park, there is a clock tower sculpture made by Lawrence Halprin in 1993. The Clock Tower features many different shapes and tones of blue tiles at the bottom and borders along glassless windows on all four walls of the tower. The top of the tower is painted yellow and the middle is painted a light red color.
Los Angeles Technical College features a contemporary sculpture of a red Pegasus entitled “Education Gives You Wings To Fly” sculpted by LATTC alumnus Hacer in 2010.

Pre-Natal Memories (1976-1980) by Mark di Suvero, an American born in Shanghai China of 1933.The genre of his sculptures are to have merged from Abstract expressionism. It is a simple, elegant and massive sculpture created by ordinary steel, located on Grand Avenue.  It is located on the north end of California Plaza east of Grand Avenue, Bunker Hill, Los Angeles, CA.  It is  5-foot high by 25-foot wide Cor-Ten steel sculpture, which took 4 years to build.

Shoshone (1982) by  Mark di Suvero, is another American Expressionist Sculpture located in the project area of Bunker Hill located on Grand Avenue. The project location is 444 Flower St, Los Angeles, CA 90071, but is now permanently closed. Shoshone is a 45-foot high, 25-ton, 13-beam painted steel sculpture; the structure was positioned to form the letters L and A at every angle. It is clear that Suvero put some time into designing a sculpture that fit the home of Los Angeles.

Right outside of the MOCA art museum, located on 250 S. Grand Ave., Los Angeles, CA, there is a sculpture called Airplane Parts by Nancy Rubins. Nancy Rubins is an American sculptor and installation artist who creates sculptures out of industrial materials such as airplane scraps. It is a “huge, improbable structure and cannot obtain a clear sense of its boundaries." It is beautifully and meticulously crafted, but what could it mean? It looks like a sculpture full of junk and it almost feels out of place, but the piece can have meaning if looked at in an artistic perspective. In 2002 MOCA purchased this sculpture and placed it right outside its location. The full title is Chas' Stainless Steel, Mark Thompson's Airplane Parts and it contains about 1,000 Pounds of Stainless Steel Wire. There are many other similar sculptures with the same concept seen around other parts of the world, and when seen one can recognize Nancy Rubin's style.

In the Little Tokyo area at the Japanese American National Museum, there is a metallic Rubik's cube look-alike structure located at 100 S Central Ave, Los Angeles, CA 90012. The sculpture is called Oomo Cube also known as "Out of Many, One" and it was created by Nicole Maloney in 2014. The sculpture is made out of steel and aluminum and photographic panels with internal lighting are mounted on a pole of this Rubik's Cube sculpture, it can be rotated and moved by the viewer.

Community Properties 
The Grand, located on Grand Avenue, has over 176,000 square feet of space dedicated towards retail, ranging from a variety of shops, a movie theater complex, diverse food inspired restaurants, an Equinox Hotel, and residential living. This center was designed by Frank Gehry, a renowned architect. When envisioning The Grand Gehry saw it has a centerpiece for Grand Avenue. He wanted to promote gatherings from communities all over. He wanted an open space for performances as well as to provide shopping and dining experiences for those who visit. Among the Grand is a 39 stories high tower called the residential tower. This tower consists of 400 plus residences.

In 2018 the “Tinker toy” parking structure was demolished. This structure was located on the east side of Grand Avenue. The parking structure had stood tall for 50 years after being built in the 1960s. This left room for the Grand to take place in.

Parks 
The California Plaza is a beautiful outdoor area where anyone can go located on Grand Avenue. It has a prime location that is located across the street from the Grand Central Market. Along the Plaza is a set of stairs, if walked up one is introduced to a surreal scenery also commonly known as Angel's Flight. From Angel's Flight a clear view of the location of the park scene from “500 Days of Summer” starring Joseph Gordon-Levitt and Zooey Deschanel can be seen. The California Plaza also has an outdoor amphitheater where concerts and other events are hosted throughout the year. The Plaza also has both street parking and Garage parking making it an easy place to visit.

Grand Hope Park is located in South Park on Grand Avenue and it became the last downtown Los Angeles landscape designed by Halprin. The park is also the final landscape along the Los Angeles Open Space Network. Other sites in the network are Wells Fargo Center, Bunker Hill Steps, and the Central Library's Maguire Gardens. Its built-in elements are diverse enough to form a mixed metaphor due to its mixture of greenery (including cypress, willow, feather and fan palm, pine, jacaranda and sycamore).

Grand Hope Park is accessible to many restaurants, activities and shops. It is located in the center of downtown Los Angeles, also known as South park. The Fashion District, Little Tokyo, the Art District are some of the main areas to find fun activities such as The Santee Alley, the Callejones, MOCA, The Last Bookstore or the Japanese American National Museum. Other attractions at closer walking distances would include the Staples Center, Grammy Museum LA Live, The Novo, or the Microsoft Theater. Traveling at farther distances can also be easy and accessible by having access to parking lots right near  Grand Hope park, such as the Music Center Main Campus Garage, Walt Disney Concert Hall Garage, Lot 10 (weekends only). Each parking structure has its different payments due to its time and events happening in the area. There are many options without having to pay or paying a small fee for a long duration.

Taking public transportation is highly encouraged to see other attractions nearby and to avoid parking fees. The Metro Red or Purple line can be taken for just $1.75 or $7 or a day pass (that is excluding senior or student prices). It is also a clean and safe park that families can enjoy, thanks to its rules. Rules such as no dogs, bicycles, skateboards, segways, hoverboards, roller skates, rollerblades, motorized vehicles, and drones.

Another reason to visit Grand Hope Park is to get a view of FIDM’ s Museum and Galleries, since the Park is located right on campus. It is also a clean and safe park that families can enjoy, thanks to its rules. Rules such as no dogs, bicycles, skateboards, segways, hoverboards, roller skates, rollerblades, motorized vehicles, and drones. Its operating hours range from 6a.m to 8 p.m daily.

Notable landmarks 
 The Broad
 California Hospital Medical Center
 Cathedral of Our Lady of the Angels
 Grand Park
 One California Plaza
 Two California Plaza
 Disney Concert Hall
 Kenneth Hahn Hall of Administration
 Los Angeles Music Center
 Los Angeles County Superior Court Stanley Mosk Courthouse – Family Law, Probate and Small Claims
 Museum of Contemporary Art, Los Angeles
 Wells Fargo Center (Los Angeles)
 Wells Fargo History Museums
 Brockman Building
 Ramon C. Cortines School of Visual and Performing Arts

References

Streets in Los Angeles
Bunker Hill, Los Angeles
Civic Center, Los Angeles
Downtown Los Angeles
Tourist attractions in Los Angeles